Rafał Piotr Siemianowski (born 25 October 1980, in Opole) is a Polish civil servant, since 2021 serving as an ambassador to Belgium.

Life 
Siemianowski graduated from international relations at the University of Warsaw (2004) and the National School of Public Administration, KSAP (2006). Between 2008 and 2009 he was president of the KSAP alumni association. He has been educated also at the IESE Business School, Barcelona, Spain and at the Georgetown University, Washington, D.C. He gained his experience as an intern at the Embassy of Poland in Bern, Switzerland (2002), at the Prefecture of the Manche Department in France (2005), at the EU Directorate-General for External Relations (2009/2010).

In 2004, Siemianowski started his professional career at the Marshal's Office of the Opole Voivodeship. In 2006 he joined the Chancellery of the Prime Minister of Poland, being promoted from a chief specialist to an advisor to the Head of the Chancellery and the Deputy Director of the Secretariat/Office of the Prime Minister. Between 2012 and 2015 he served at the Embassy of Poland, London as counsellor for scientific and academic cooperation as well as political affairs. In 2015, he returned to the post of the Deputy Director of the Office of the Prime Minister. In 2017, he was appointed to the Board of the Polish National Agency for Academic Exchange. On 23 October 2020 he became Undersecretary of State, Deputy Head of the Chancellery of the Prime Minister. In 2021, Siemianowski was nominated Poland ambassador to Belgium. He took the post on 20 November 2021.

He is married, with one daughter.

References 

1980 births
Ambassadors of Poland to Belgium
Living people
National School of Public Administration (Poland) alumni
People from Opole
University of Warsaw alumni